Pigeon Religion were an American post-punk band formed in 2008 in Phoenix, Arizona. Originally, the band consisted of William Watson on bass and vocals, Gary Anarchy on guitar and vocals and Jes Aurelius on drums. After a 2009 Summer West Coast Tour, Gary Anarchy quit the band and left Watson and Aurelius as the principal members, who continued to split all songwriting duties until the band broke up in 2010.

Live shows

Pigeon Religion live shows were notorious for their uncomfortable atmosphere, characterized by violence and excessively loud volume. Pigeon Religion were rarely able finish a full set without being shut down by police or angry show promoters. In their first year of existence, they performed over 100 live shows and were cited by the Arizona Republic as "The Hardest Working Band in Phoenix", as well as having numerous write-ups in the Phoenix New Times that mentioned their blitzkrieg promotional tactics. To perform live, they enlisted the help of various notable Phoenix musicians. Their most recent list of live contributors was Drek Campbell (Filthy Grin), James Fella (Gilgongo Records, Soft Shoulder), Anthony Doran, Preston Bryant (My Feral Kin, French Quarter), Stuben Steinberg (French Quarter), Vincent S. Baeza, N.Nappa, Anna Nasty (Hell-Kite, Olivia Neutron-John).

Discography

Studio albums
WHY DO YOU HATE PIGEON RELIGION (Ward-9) (2008)

Cassette releases
Live in the E.R. (Smoke And Mirrors) (2008)
Crystallized Meth PROMO (self released) (2009)
Warm Insides (Drone Errant) (2010)
Live at KDVS (Campaign for Infinity) (2010)

Singles
Scorpion Milk (Parts Unknown)' (2009)Dead Boss (Gilgongo / Jarson INTL) (2009)Crystallized Meth (Video Disease)'' (2010)

References

External links
Parts Unknown Records
Gilgongo Records

Avant-garde ensembles
American art rock groups
American experimental musical groups
American industrial rock musical groups
American noise rock music groups
American post-punk music groups
Musical groups established in 2008
Musical groups from Phoenix, Arizona
Rock music groups from Arizona